Joe Cator (born 15 June 1998) is a professional rugby league footballer who plays as a loose forward  for Hull F.C. in the Betfred Super League.

He played for Hull Kingston Rovers in the Championship and the Super League, and on loan from Hull KR at the Coventry Bears and the Newcastle Thunder in Betfred League 1. Cator also played for the Leigh Centurions in the Betfred Championship.

Background
Cator was born in Kingston Upon Hull, East Riding of Yorkshire, England.

Playing career

Hull KR
Cator began his career with Hull Kingston Rovers and was part of the side which was promoted back to the Super League.  He then spent time on loan at Leigh before signing for his boyhood club Hull F.C.

Hull FC
Cator played 11 games for Hull F.C. in the 2020 Super League season including the club's semi-final defeat against Wigan.

Cator had a loan spell with Bradford during the early stages of 2020. When he returned to Hull, he became one of the standout performers and went on to win the club's Young Player of the Year award at the end of the season.

References

External links
Hull KR profile
SL profile

1998 births
Living people
Bradford Bulls players
Coventry Bears players
Hull F.C. players
Hull Kingston Rovers players
Leigh Leopards players
Newcastle Thunder players
Rugby league centres
Rugby league players from Kingston upon Hull
Rugby league second-rows